Ilya Chernyshov (born 6 September 1985) is a Kazakh cyclist. He competed in the men's Madison at the 2004 Summer Olympics.

Palmares
2006
1st Asian Games Team Time Trial
1st Overall Tour d'Egypte
1st Stage 2
2007
2nd Overall Mainfranken Tour
2008
1st Stage 1 Cycling Golden Jersey (TTT)

References

1985 births
Living people
Kazakhstani male cyclists
Place of birth missing (living people)
Asian Games medalists in cycling
Cyclists at the 2006 Asian Games
Asian Games gold medalists for Kazakhstan
Asian Games silver medalists for Kazakhstan
Asian Games bronze medalists for Kazakhstan
Medalists at the 2006 Asian Games
Olympic cyclists of Kazakhstan
Cyclists at the 2004 Summer Olympics
20th-century Kazakhstani people
21st-century Kazakhstani people